The Tegernsee Mountains form a mountain region between the River Isar in the west and the lake of Tegernsee as well as the Rottach, Weißen Valepp and Grundache south of the Tegernsee, in the east, and so form a part of the Bavarian Prealps. The Tegernsee Mountains are also the westernmost part of the Mangfall Mountains (Mangfallgebirge).

Well-known walking destinations are the peaks of a range of medium-high mountains with heights of under 2000 m. Climbing areas are the massifs of Roßstein, Buchstein, and Plankenstein.

Notable peaks 

 Halserspitz (1,862 m)
 Risserkogel (1,826 m)
 Schinder (1,808 m)
 Plankenstein (1,768 m)
 Buchstein (1,701 m)
 Roßstein (1,698 m)
 Hirschberg (1,670 m)
 Schönberg (1,620 m)
 Leonhardstein (1,452 m)
 Fockenstein (1,564 m). 

Mountain ranges of Bavaria
Mountain ranges of the Alps
Bavarian Prealps